Dredging is a cooking technique used to coat wet or moist foods with a dry ingredient prior to cooking. Put most simply, dredging involves little more than pulling or rolling the wet food through the dry material to provide an even coating. The technique is particularly common with breaded foods, such as fried fish or chicken cutlets.

Advantages of dredging
There are several reasons to dredge food prior to sautéing or frying:
The flour and other dry ingredients seal in moisture to prevent the food from becoming tough.
The coating applied to the food acts as a barrier that keeps the food from sticking to the pan as it cooks.
The coating helps to brown the food and provide a crunchy surface.
The coating enables the exterior of the food to become crisp and darken evenly without burning.
The seasoning in the coating adds flavor to the food.

See also

 List of cooking techniques

References

Cooking techniques